The Candler Oak Tree is located in Savannah, Georgia, United States, and is estimated to have been growing since the 1700s, making it one of the oldest living landmarks in the area.

The largest tree in Georgia is located off of Mann Road, Palmetto, Georgia.

Location
The Candler Oak Tree is located on the property of Savannah College of Art and Design at Ruskin Hall, 516 Drayton Street, Savannah, Georgia. The tree is located adjacent to Forsyth Park.

History
In 1984, the Savannah Tree Foundation secured the nation's first conservation easement on a single tree and a  easement was established to protect the Candler Oak from loss to development. In 2001, the Georgia Urban Forest Council designated the tree as a Georgia Landmark and Historic Tree. In 2012, Savannah Law School purchased the historic property on which the Candler Oak resides. The law school tried to take measures to protect the tree by putting up fences, reserving space for the tree's lowest branches, and placed the tree under security surveillance. The tree also served as the law school's logo. The law school closed and is now owned by Savannah College of Art and Design.

Gallery

See also
 List of individual trees

References

Individual oak trees
Savannah, Georgia
Individual trees in Georgia (U.S. state)